Hanna (Anna) Vyachaslavauna Shcherba (born 11 January 1982) is a Belarusian-French swimmer who won six medals, mostly in medley events, at the European Championships of 2002–2004. She competed in four events at the 2004 and 2008 Summer Olympics with the best achievement of sixth place in the 4 × 100 m freestyle relay in 2008.

Biography 
Shcherba was born in Baranovichi, Belarus. She has a younger sister Mariya Shcherba who is also an Olympic swimmer. In October 2001 Hanna moved to France where she first competed for the club Melun, but then changed to CS Clichy. In 2005, she married Arnaud Lorgeril, a French competitive swimmer whom she knew from 2002, and changed her name and nationality; thus at the 2008 Olympics she competed for France as Shcherba-Lorgeril. She speaks Russian and French and works as a swimming coach at CS Clichy.

References

1982 births
Living people
Swimmers at the 2004 Summer Olympics
Swimmers at the 2008 Summer Olympics
French female freestyle swimmers
French female medley swimmers
Belarusian female freestyle swimmers
Belarusian female medley swimmers
Olympic swimmers of Belarus
Olympic swimmers of France
European Aquatics Championships medalists in swimming
Sportspeople from Hauts-de-Seine
People from Baranavichy District
Belarusian emigrants to France
Mediterranean Games silver medalists for France
Mediterranean Games medalists in swimming
Swimmers at the 2009 Mediterranean Games
Sportspeople from Brest Region